Beauharnois-Salaberry may refer to:
 Beauharnois-Salaberry Regional County Municipality in Quebec
 Beauharnois—Salaberry, a federal electoral district in Quebec